Mengovirus, also known as Columbia SK virus, mouse Elberfield virus, and Encephalomyocarditisvirus (EMCV), belongs to the genus Cardiovirus which is a member of the Picornaviridae. Its genome is a single stranded positive-sense RNA molecule, making the Mengoviruses a class IV virus under the Baltimore classification system. The genome is approximately 8400nt in length, and has 5’ VG protein (Virus genome protein) and a 3’ polyadenine tail. Mengovirus was isolated by George W. A. Dick in 1948, in the Mengo district of Entebbe in Uganda, from a captive rhesus monkey that had developed hind limb paralysis.

Structure 
Mengovirus is a non-enveloped virus which has a nucleocapsid made up of 12 subunits. The virion is 30 nm in diameter and displays icosahedral symmetry.

Gene expression and genome replication 
Once inside a host cell, the Mengovirus genome acts as a piece of mRNA and is directly translated by the host ribosomes in the cytoplasm. There is a large un-translated region at the 5’ end of the RNA that has a ribosome binding site, removing the need of a cap. A single polypeptide is made and is cleaved into individual proteins by viral proteases. The genome is divided into three parts: P1, P2, and P3. P1 encodes the virus capsid proteins, P2 and P3 encode genes required for genome replication to occur. For replication to occur an intermediate double-stranded RNA molecule is made to be used as a template for the production of positive sense genomes.

Infection 
Mengovirus is infectious to vertebrate animals, and has been isolated from mice and other rodents. It can also cause acute fever in humans. There is no specific treatment for a Mengovirus infection; although dipyridamole has been shown to inhibit its replication. The illness is not severe enough to require vaccination. The Mengovirus is able to suppress the host's immune response by reducing the expression of Nuclear Factor kappa B using the 5’ un-translated region.

References

Further reading
 Rueckert RR (1990) Picornavirus and their multiplication. In: Fields BN, Knipe DM (eds) Virology, 2nd edn. Raven Press, New York, pp 507–548.
 Encephalomyocarditisvirus ICTVdB Index of Viruses, Version 28, June, 2002. Retrieved on 2007-07-15.
 
 

Cardioviruses